On this page, environmental lawsuit means "a lawsuit where the well-being of an environmental asset or the well-being of a set of environmental assets is in dispute".  Also on this page, lawsuit with environmental relevance means "a lawsuit where a non-environmental entity or a set of non-environmental entities is in dispute, but whose outcome has relevance for an environmental asset or for a set of environmental assets".

Because the distinction between the two types of lawsuit is not clearly defined, it is beneficial to keep the two lists together on one page, but separated according to that distinction.

Environmental lawsuits

Lawsuits with environmental relevance

See also

Environment courts
Environment Court of New Zealand
Kunming § Environmental court (in People's Republic of China)
Land and Environment Court of New South Wales
Livability Court

Other related topics
2006 Côte d'Ivoire toxic waste dump § Lawsuit by victims
Agent Orange § U.S. veterans class action lawsuit against manufacturers (class action environmental lawsuit)
Armley asbestos disaster § Chase Manhattan Bank v T&N
Armley asbestos disaster § Margereson v J.W. Roberts Ltd. and Hancock v J.W. Roberts Ltd.
Bhopal disaster § Legal action against Union Carbide
Black Bike Week § Noise limit faces lawsuit (class action environmental lawsuit)
Bougainville Copper § US lawsuit (class action environmental lawsuit)
Camelford water pollution incident § Legal actions against South West Water Authority (in Cornwall in England)
Collision between MV Testbank and MV Sea Daniel
Conservation Law Foundation (CLF) (in New England in the US)
Corby toxic waste case
Deepwater Horizon litigation
Dow Chemical Company § Nuclear weapons (class action environmental lawsuit)
DuPont and C-8
Environmental crime
Environmental criminology
Environmental impact assessment
Environmental justice
Environmental law
Environmental racism
Global warming controversy § Litigation (class action environmental lawsuit)
Grazing rights in Nevada § Federal grazing legal cases
Greenpeace Arctic Sunrise ship case
International Court of Justice advisory opinion on the Legality of the Threat or Use of Nuclear Weapons
International Network for Environmental Compliance and Enforcement (INECE)
Kearl Oil Sands Project § Criticism (in Alberta in Canada)
Keele Valley Landfill § Resident class action lawsuit (class action environmental lawsuit)
Keystone Pipeline § Lawsuits
Lac-Mégantic derailment § Litigation
Lead contamination in Washington, D.C. drinking water § Class-action lawsuit (class action environmental lawsuit)
Lindane § Morton Grove lawsuit
List of environmental agreements
List of environmental law reviews and journals
List of environmental laws by country
Mackenzie Valley Pipeline Inquiry
Marine mammals and sonar § Court cases
McCullom Lake, Illinois § Class action lawsuit (class action environmental lawsuit)
Monsanto legal cases
Niigata Minamata disease § Patients' lawsuit (in Japan)
Organic Act of 1897 § Izaak Walton League lawsuit (in the United States)
Pulp mill conflict between Argentina and Uruguay
San Diego Gas & Electric (SDG&E)
School District 36 Surrey § Environment (in British Columbia in Canada)
Shannon, Quebec § Cancer cluster (in Canada)
Startups, shutdowns, and malfunctions
Syncrude § Greenpeace lawsuit
TerraCycle § Legal issues
Toxic tort
U.S. Army Corps of Engineers civil works controversies (New Orleans) § Legal issues in New Orleans
Water contamination in Crestwood, Illinois § Second class action lawsuit (class action environmental lawsuit)
Water contamination in Crestwood, Illinois § Third class action lawsuit (class action environmental lawsuit)

External links
High Court Limits Liability in Superfund Cases - NYTimes.com
Case Weighing Canal’s Role in Damage by Hurricane Katrina - NYTimes.com
Largest-ever Endangered Species Act lawsuit filed
Mississippi's first class-action lawsuit filed over oil spill - Oil Spill - SunHerald.com (30 April 2010)
Environmental Matters Cases filed :: Justia Dockets & Filings
Cases filed in Alabama matching "Transocean Offshore Deepwater Drilling, Inc." :: Justia Dockets & Filings
Cases filed in Florida matching "Transocean Offshore Deepwater Drilling, Inc." :: Justia Dockets & Filings
Cases filed in Georgia matching "Transocean Offshore Deepwater Drilling, Inc." :: Justia Dockets & Filings
Cases filed in Louisiana matching "Transocean Offshore Deepwater Drilling, Inc." :: Justia Dockets & Filings
Cases filed in Mississippi matching "Transocean Offshore Deepwater Drilling, Inc." :: Justia Dockets & Filings
Cases filed in Texas matching "Transocean Offshore Deepwater Drilling, Inc." :: Justia Dockets & Filings
Climate Change Litigation Databases

 
Case law lists by subject
Lists of lawsuits